Pseudoperiboeum is a genus of beetles in the family Cerambycidae, containing the following species:

 Pseudoperiboeum lengi (Schaeffer, 1909)
 Pseudoperiboeum subarmatum Linsley, 1935

References

Elaphidiini